Lenger is a village in Bozyazı district of Mersin Province, Turkey. It is situated at the northeast of Bozyazı. The population of the village was 227. as of 2012.

References

Villages in Bozyazı District